Manizan (also Romanized as Mānīzān; also known as Mīzān) is a village in Jowzan Rural District, in the Central District of Malayer County, Hamadan Province, Iran. At the 2006 census, its population was 618, in 228 families.

References 

Populated places in Malayer County